The Panasonic Lumix DMC-LX7, or LX7, is a high-end compact "point and shoot" camera launched by Panasonic in 2012 to succeed the LX5.

Features 
The LX7 has:.
 High sensitivity 1/1.7-inch MOS sensor (10.1 megapixels)
 24 – 90 mm (35 mm equivalent) ultra wide-angle f/1.4 - 2.3 LEICA DC VARIO-SUMMICRON lens (3.8x optical zoom)
 POWER O.I.S (optical image stabilizer)
 3.0-inch (920,000-dot) TFT LCD
 Optional full manual operation
 HD 1080p/60 quality movie clips in AVCHD and Motion JPEG format
 HDMI output

Lens 

The Leica lens is unusually fast for a compact camera, with a maximum aperture of f/1.4. The 3.8x maximum zoom of the lens is relatively limited, however, and zooming limits the aperture. For example, at 2x optical zoom, the maximum aperture (lowest f-stop) is f/1.8, and at 3.8x zoom it is f/2.3.

No lens correction is applied to files stored in RAW mode (.RW2 extension). The following table provides empirically determined lens distortion factors that can be used with the GIMP image processing software’s “Lens Distortion” plug-in to approximate the lens-correction provided by the camera in its JPEG images:

The experimental estimates for the “zoom” value do not follow any consistent curve, and a constant “zoom” value of -1.0 may be appropriate.

Accessories 

Official Panasonic accessories available separately include an electronic live viewfinder, external optical viewfinder (both of which attach to the camera's hot-shoe), spare batteries, filter adaptor ring (which allows the attachment of 37mm filters), 'PU leather' case, A/C adaptor (to allow mains power of the camera), HDMI mini cable, and a selection of external flashes.

Similar cameras 
 Leica D-LUX 6

Notes

External links
 
 Lumix Official Website UK
 Lumix Official Website USA
 Official Website Global
 LX7 Official Website Global

Panasonic Lumix cameras